David Anthony Manning (born August 14, 1972) is a former starting pitcher in Major League Baseball who played for the Milwaukee Brewers in .

Career
Manning was selected by the Texas Rangers in the third round of the 1992 MLB Draft out of the Palm Beach State College, where he pitched for the Panthers school team.

Manning spent 15 years in Minor, independent and foreign leagues which included stints with 24 different teams in 17 leagues, four countries and five Major League organizations.

Sources

External links
, or  Pura Pelota (Venezuelan Winter League)

1972 births
Living people
Águilas de Mexicali players
Algodoneros de Guasave players
American expatriate baseball players in Mexico
American expatriate baseball players in Canada
Baseball players from Buffalo, New York
Bowie Baysox players
Butte Copper Kings players
Calgary Vipers players
Charleston Rainbows players
Charlotte Rangers players
Gulf Coast Rangers players
Diablos Rojos del México players
Indianapolis Indians players
Iowa Cubs players
Joliet JackHammers players
Long Island Ducks players
Major League Baseball pitchers
Mexican League baseball pitchers
Milwaukee Brewers players
New Britain Rock Cats players
Oklahoma City 89ers players
Oklahoma RedHawks players
Palm Beach State Panthers baseball players
Piratas de Campeche players
Tiburones de La Guaira players
Tigres de Aragua players
Tulsa Drillers players
West Tennessee Diamond Jaxx players
Winnipeg Goldeyes players
American expatriate baseball players in Taiwan
Brother Elephants players
Caribes de Oriente players
American expatriate baseball players in Venezuela
La New Bears players